Muraoka (written: 村岡 lit. "village hill") is a Japanese surname. Notable people with the surname include:

Alan Muraoka (born 1962), Japanese-American actor and theatre director
, Japanese footballer
Lenore Muraoka (born 1955), American golfer
, Japanese sprinter
, Japanese shakuhachi player
, Japanese Hebraist
, Japanese footballer
, Japanese politician

Japanese-language surnames